Church Songs is an 1884 collection of hymns and songs composed and compiled for Church of England and Episcopal Church usage by Sabine Baring-Gould, in collaboration with Henry Fleetwood Sheppard. Church Songs was intended to provide a church substitute for the phenomenally successful 1877 Moody-Sankey hymn book. At the time Baring-Gould was parish priest at Lew Trenchard, Devonshire. The book was published by Skeffington in England and in New York by James Pott and Co., also in 1884.

References

Anglican hymnals
1884 books

Anglican liturgical books